Naziri is a surname. Notable people with the surname include:

Elhad Naziri (born 1992), Azerbaijani footballer
Mirwais Naziri (fl. 2009), Afghan cricketer

See also
Nazir (name)